Urraca Afonso (c.1260-1290?) was a Portuguese noble lady, illegitimate daughter of Afonso III of Portugal and Madragana Ben Aloandro. And half sister of Denis of Portugal.

Urraca was twice married, first to Pedro Anes Gago, and then with João Mendes de Briteiros.

References 

1260 births
1300s deaths
13th-century Portuguese people
14th-century Portuguese people
Portuguese nobility
Portuguese Roman Catholics
Daughters of kings